Lola Wajnblum (born 22 January 1996) is a Belgian footballer who plays as a forward and has appeared for the Belgium women's national team.

Career
Wajnblum has been capped for the Belgium national team, appearing for the team during the 2019 FIFA Women's World Cup qualifying cycle.

References

External links
 
 
 

1996 births
Living people
Belgian women's footballers
Women's association football forwards
Belgium women's international footballers
Oud-Heverlee Leuven (women) players